Oceanside station may refer to:

 Oceanside station (LIRR)
 Oceanside Transit Center